David Sneddon MBE (24 April 1936 – 24 December 2020) was a Scottish football player and manager. His career is notable for managing Kilmarnock to their 1979 Tennent Caledonian Cup victory and also being part of the 1964–65 Scottish First Division winning Kilmarnock side. Sneddon was capped once by the Scotland national under-23 football team.

He was appointed a Member of the Order of the British Empire (MBE) in the 2014 Birthday Honours "for services to Kilmarnock Football Club and the
community in Kilmarnock, Ayrshire." Sneddon died on 24 December 2020 at the age of 84.

References

External links

Davie Sneddon at Killiefc.com

1936 births
2020 deaths
Association football inside forwards
Scottish footballers
Dundee F.C. players
Preston North End F.C. players
Kilmarnock F.C. players
Raith Rovers F.C. players
Scottish Football League players
English Football League players
Scotland under-23 international footballers
Scottish football managers
Kilmarnock F.C. managers
Stranraer F.C. managers
Scottish Football League managers
Kilwinning Rangers F.C. players
Members of the Order of the British Empire